Lemberger is a surname of German origin demonym for a person from the Polish city Lwów (German: Lemberg), now Lviv, Ukraine. Notable people with the surname include:

 Georg Lemberger (c.1490–1500 – c.1540–1545), German painter and woodcut artist
 , Polish Jewish actor
 Hans Leinberger sometimes given as Lemberger (c.1475/1480 – after 1531), Late Gothic sculptor from Altbayern
 Jean Lemberger (1924-1993), Polish Jew born French FTP-MOI from Des terroristes à la retraite
 Ken Lemberger (born 1946), American film producer
 LeAnn Lemberger, American writer published as "Leigh Michaels"
 Leopold Lemberger, Austrian-Swiss film director known as "Leopold Lindtberg"
 Shimon Lemberger, Makova Rebbe in Kiryat Ata

See also 
 Blaufränkisch, a grape variety also known as Lemberger, or Blauer Limberger
 Lemberg (disambiguation)

German-language surnames